Candice Iloh is a queer, first-generation Nigerian-American writer, poet, educator and dancer. Their debut novel, Every Body Looking,  was a finalist for the National Book Award for Young People's Literature and Michael L. Printz Award honor book.

Personal life 
Iloh graduated from Howard University, where they studied public relations. In 2017, they received a Master of Fine Arts from Lesley University, where they studied Writing for Young People and Poetry. They completed residencies at VONA, The Home School via Lambda Literary, and the Rhode Island Writer’s Colony.

Iloh's mother, Debrah, struggled with addiction throughout Iloh's life. She ultimately died of stomach cancer in 2018.

Iloh uses they/them pronouns. They presently live in Philadelphia.

Career 
At a poet, Iloh has performed nationally, including the Nuyorican Poets Café in New York City, the Reginald F. Lewis Museum in Baltimore, and the National Museum of African Art in Washington, D.C. They have also advanced to the final rounds in the following competitions: Graffiti DC Slam, Beltway Poetry Slam, and 11th Hour Poetry Slam.

Iloh's poetry has been published by Blackberry Magazine, Blavity, Fjords Review, For Harriet, TheGrio, Insight Magazine, and the Lambda Literary Foundation.

Iloh created a one-person show, Ada: On Stage, which debuted in 2018 at Hi-ARTS.

Iloh served as the Managing Editor of Quiet Lunch Magazine.

They have also worked as an educator and coach with Voices UnBroken,  Split This Rock, and the American Poetry Museum. Through their work, Iloh has mentored young people in public school classrooms, athletic programs, detention centers, and youth shelters.

Awards and honors 
In 2013, Iloh received a fellowship from Voices of Our Nation Arts Foundation to work with Ruth Forman.

In 2016, they received the Lambda Literary Home School Fellowship, during which they studied under Cathy Park Hong. They were also attended the Rhode Island Writers Colony under the Artistic Direction of Jason Reynolds.

Later, they were a Writer-in-Residence at the Bronx Academy of Letters.

Publications 
Iloh's poetry has been published by Blackberry Magazine, Blavity, Fjords Review, For Harriet, TheGrio, Insight Magazine, and the Lambda Literary Foundation.

Books 

 Break Fast From Her Skin (2014)
 In The Breakbeats Poets, Volume 2: Black Girl Magic Anthology (2018) 
 Every Body Looking (2020) 
 Break This House (2022) 
 Salt the Water (2023)

References

External links 
 

Howard University alumni
Lesley University alumni
LGBT African Americans
American people of Nigerian descent
American LGBT poets
LGBT people from Pennsylvania
American non-binary writers